Michel Pilz (born October 28, 1945, Bad Neustadt) is a German jazz clarinetist.

Pilz was a student in clarinet at the Luxembourg Conservatory in the mid-1960s, then joined Manfred Schoof's ensemble in 1968, an association he would maintain into the 1980s. He also performed with the German All Stars in the 1970s and with the Globe Unity Orchestra, led by Alex Schlippenbach. He founded his own ensemble in 1972, playing with, among others, Peter Kowald, Paul Lovens, Buschi Niebergall, and Itaru Oki.

References
Wolfram Knauer, "Michel Pilz". The New Grove Dictionary of Jazz, 2nd edn.

1945 births
Living people
German jazz clarinetists
21st-century clarinetists
Globe Unity Orchestra members
Clarinet Contrast members